Kostiw is a surname. Notable people with the surname include:

Adriana Kostiw (born 1974), Brazilian sailor
Michael Kostiw (born 1947), Central Intelligence Agency employee